"The Streak" is a country/novelty song written, produced, and sung by Ray Stevens.  It was released in February 1974 as the lead single to his album Boogity Boogity. "The Streak" capitalized on the then-popular craze of streaking. In 2007, Cledus T. Judd covered "The Streak" on his album Boogity Boogity - A Tribute to the Comic Genius of Ray Stevens.

One of Stevens' most successful recordings, "The Streak" was his second No. 1 on the Billboard Hot 100 singles chart in the US, spending three weeks at the top in May 1974, as well as reaching No. 3 on the Billboard Hot Country Singles chart. A major international hit, it also reached No. 1 on the UK Singles Chart, spending a single week at the top of the chart in June 1974. In total it sold over five million copies internationally and ranked on Billboard′s top hits of 1974 at number 8.

Origin
Stevens has stated that he first got the idea for the song while reading a news magazine on an airplane. The magazine included a brief item about streaking, and Stevens thought that it was a "great idea for a song" and started writing notes; later, he wrote some lines after returning home from his trip, but did not complete the song at that time. Some time later, Stevens says he "woke up and it was all over the news. Everywhere you turned, people were talking about streakers". Stevens then rushed to complete and record the song and have it released. According to Stevens, there were already 15 other songs released about streaking by the time his was released, and there ended up being 35 to 40 such records in all.

Stevens had released the song less than a week before the televised 46th Academy Awards, during which Robert Opel created an uproar after he streaked across the stage behind host David Niven.

Content
Each of the three verses starts with a news reporter, played by Stevens, reporting on disturbances at a supermarket, a service station, and a high school gymnasium during a basketball playoff. The reporter interviews a witness at each disturbance, who turns out to be the same man every time (also played by Stevens), describing what he saw and how he tried to warn his wife Ethel to avert her eyes ("Don't look, Ethel!"), but is always too late. After each interview, a chorus is sung by multiple voices, though the chorus is the only part of the song that is actually sung while the rest is spoken. After the third interview, the man sees the Streak again, and to his horror, Ethel is streaking too, with the witness yelling:. "You get your clothes on", and "Say it ain't so". During and after each chorus, Ray Stevens blows a siren whistle. The laughter was from a recorded laughing machine.

Music video
In 1992, eighteen years after the song's original release, Stevens, using a newly-produced version, starred in a music video of "The Streak" as part of a video album called "Ray Stevens Comedy Video Classics".

The music video remains faithful to the original song's story line, and Stevens again portrays the news reporter and Ethel's husband. An animated version of the Streak (a caricature of Stevens) is featured, while an unidentified actor playing the Streak is briefly shown from the knees down.

The video features "behind the scenes" segments before and after the song: A prim and prudish woman, depicted as being from Standards & Practices (S&P), sternly warns Stevens not to do anything in the video that has to be censored. At the end, after nearly everyone winds up disrobing and joining in with the Streak and (an animated version of) Ethel, the S&P woman, worse for wear, grudgingly admits that Stevens "barely" managed to stay within the confines of decency; after she storms away, Stevens looks into the camera and, imitating Ethel's husband, mutters, "Yeah, I did."

Belton Richard cover version 
In 1974, the Cajun accordionist and vocalist Belton Richard released "Cajun Streak", a cover version of the song with the lyrics and spoken word passages translated into Cajun French.

Remix
In 2013, Stevens performed a remix version of "The Streak" live in concert.

Charts

Weekly charts

Year-end charts

All-time charts

References

External links
 Lyrics of this song
 

1974 singles
UK Singles Chart number-one singles
Billboard Hot 100 number-one singles
Cashbox number-one singles
Ray Stevens songs
Songs written by Ray Stevens
RPM Top Singles number-one singles
Number-one singles in New Zealand
Novelty songs
1974 songs